Oamaru Peak is a peak 2 nautical miles (3.7 km) north of Mount Terra Nova on Ross Island. The feature rises to c.1000 m 1 nautical mile (1.9 km) north of Caldwell Peak. Named by New Zealand Geographic Board (NZGB) (2000) after Oamaru, in Otago, New Zealand, the port the Terra Nova first visited after the death of Captain Robert F. Scott.

Mountains of Ross Island